Piotr Mieszkowski, Senior (died 1652) was a bishop suffragan (episcopus suffraganeus) of Włocławek. Author of several political books and brochures, among them Institutio peregrinationum, peregrinantibus peroportuna..., (Lovanium, 1625).

In 1644 he consecrated the church Katedra p.w. Najświętszej Panny Marii in Włocławek.

See also 
 Piotr Mieszkowski (iuniore), bishop sufragan in late 17th century

References

 Polski Słownik Biograficzny
 Hanna Dziechcińska, O staropolskich dziennikach podróży
 EPOKA Wocławek (in Polish)

External links and additional sources
 (for Chronology of Bishops) 
 (for Chronology of Bishops)  
 (for Chronology of Bishops) 
 (for Chronology of Bishops)  

1652 deaths
Bishops of Kujawy and Włocławek
Polish male writers
Year of birth unknown
Bishops appointed by Pope Urban VIII
17th-century Roman Catholic bishops in the Polish–Lithuanian Commonwealth